Chris Hansen (born 7 May 1956) is a former Australian rules footballer who played with Fitzroy and Footscray in the Victorian Football League (VFL).

Hansen was originally from Old Trinity Grammarians and won the Woodrow Medal in 1976. A defender, Hansen often played on the tall opposition forward. He was at Fitzroy for six seasons, making 101 appearances, followed by a two season stint at Footscray, before retiring to work as a lawyer.

References

1956 births
Australian rules footballers from Victoria (Australia)
Fitzroy Football Club players
Western Bulldogs players
20th-century Australian lawyers
Living people